Loutro (Greek: Λουτρό) may refer to several places in Greece:

Loutro (island), a rocky islet near the southwestern coast of Crete
Loutro, Aetolia-Acarnania, a village in Aetolia-Acarnania 
Loutro, Chania, a village in the Chania regional unit of Crete
Loutro, Karditsa, a village in the municipality Sofades, Karditsa regional unit 
Loutro, Elassona, a village in the municipality Elassona, Larissa regional unit 
Loutro, Larissa, a village in the municipality Larissa, Larissa regional unit 
Loutro, Messenia, a village in Messenia
Kato Loutro, a village in the municipality Xylokastro-Evrostina, Corinthia
Palaio Loutro, a village in Messenia

See also
Loutros (disambiguation)